is a dam in Soeda, Fukuoka Prefecture, Japan.

References

Dams in Fukuoka Prefecture
Dams completed in 1975